Priyanandanan is an Indian film and drama director from Kerala. His second movie, Pulijanmam, received the National Film Award for Best Feature Film in 2006.

Biography
Priyanandanan is a native of Vallachira in Thrissur District, Kerala. He was born as the son of Thottipparambil Ramakrishnan and Kochammini

Priyanandanan started in career as an actor in stage shows. His career started as a female character. Later he ventured into direction of stage shows. He used to be known as Priyan Vallachira at that time.
Priyanandanan started his film career under famous directors K. R. Mohanan, P. T. Kunju Muhammed and Manilal. He began filming numerous newsreels and documentary shorts, which include Fight for Land and Man or Manninum Manushyanum Vendiyulla Samarangal (about Comrade Achudanandan), People's Leader or Jana Nayakan about E. K. Nayanar, Teacher or Gurunathan (about Sanskrit expert K P C Narayanan Bhattathiri), and The History of Strikes in Trissur District or Trissur Jillayile Samara Charithrangal. 
His first movie was Neythukaran (2001) and it told the story of a weaver, a supporter of E. M. S. Namboodiripad. Murali won the National Award for the Best Actor for this film. Priyan also directed several television films including four shorts based on M. T. Vasudevan Nair's short stories, and Asokan Cheruvil's Dead People’s Sea (Marichavarude Kadal).

Filmography

As director

As actor

References

External links

 https://web.archive.org/web/20110526002732/http://www.cinemaofmalayalam.net/priyanandan.html
 http://www.badalmediacinemacompany.in

Living people
Malayalam film directors
People from Thrissur district
21st-century Indian film directors
Film directors from Kerala
1966 births
Directors who won the Best Feature Film National Film Award
Male actors from Thrissur